Basell Polyolefins was a joint venture between BASF and Royal Dutch Shell. Leonard Blavatnik's Access Industries acquired it from the venturers for $5.7 billion in August 2005. In 2007, Basell merged with the privately owned US company Lyondell Chemical Company to form LyondellBasell, which went bankrupt in the US in January 2009 and emerged from bankruptcy in April 2010.

Basell was the world's largest producer of polypropylene and advanced polyolefins products, the world's largest producer of polyethylene, and a global leader in the development and licensing of polypropylene and polyethylene processes, and  a leader in catalysts.

Company history

Basell's heritage comes from many companies, including BASF, Hercules, Himont, Hoechst, ICI, Montecatini, Montedison and Royal Dutch Shell. However Basell, and then later LyondellBasell, had its origin in a joint venture between BASF and Royal Dutch Shell. Spurred on by the work of Nobel Prize-winning scientists Karl Ziegler and Giulio Natta, these Basell predecessor companies were among the leaders of the polyolefin revolution that began in the late 1930s and 1950s. This transformation is still driving the petrochemicals industry today.  In 2007, driven on by its then owners Access Industries and against the advice of Basell senior management, Basell acquired the privately owned US company Lyondell Chemical Company to form LyondellBasell, paying far above the market rate for the shares. The main winner was Access, who also held significant shares in Lyondell and was able to realise a massive profit by forcing Basell to overpay. This drove the new company rapidly to file for chapter 11 in the US in January 2009, from which it emerged in May 2010.

Chemical companies of the Netherlands
Joint ventures
BASF
Former Shell plc subsidiaries
Chemical companies of Germany